Murray S. Daw is an American physicist.

Daw graduated from the University of Florida in 1976 with a bachelor's of science degree in physics. He undertook doctoral study in the subject at the California Institute of Technology, guided by advisers Darryl Smith and Tom McGill. Upon completing his Ph.D. in 1981, Daw worked at the Sandia National Laboratories until 1994, when he began teaching at Clemson. He was appointed R. A. Bowen Professor of Physics in 2003, and Dean's Distinguished Professor of Physics in 2021. Daw was affiliated with Motorola between 1998 and 2000. He was elected a fellow the American Physical Society in 2000, while working at Motorola, "[f]or his original contributions to the atomic scale modeling of the properties of solids, surface, interfaces and defects." The American Academy of Arts and Sciences granted Daw an equivalent honor in 2004.

References

Motorola employees
Sandia National Laboratories people
Fellows of the American Academy of Arts and Sciences
Fellows of the American Physical Society
University of Florida alumni
Living people
Year of birth missing (living people)
20th-century American physicists
21st-century American physicists
Clemson University faculty
California Institute of Technology alumni